Thomas Francis Constantine Brophy (March 12, 1897 – June 29, 1930) was a Canadian professional ice hockey goaltender who played one season in the National Hockey League with the Quebec Bulldogs, in 1919–20. He played in 21 games and allowed 148 goals. He was born in Montreal, Quebec.

Career statistics

Regular season and playoffs

References

External links

1897 births
1930 deaths
Anglophone Quebec people
Canadian ice hockey goaltenders
Ice hockey people from Montreal
Quebec Bulldogs players